Méry-sur-Oise is a railway station in the commune of Méry-sur-Oise (Val-d'Oise department), France. The station is served by Transilien H trains, on the line from Paris to Persan-Beaumont via Saint-Leu-la-Forêt. The daily number of passengers was between 500 and 2,500 in 2002. Méry-sur-Oise is located on the line from Ermont-Eaubonne to Valmondois, that was opened in 1876. The line was electrified in 1970.

Bus connections

STIVO: 56
Valoise: 30.29
Busval d'Oise: 95.17

Photos

See also
List of SNCF stations in Île-de-France

References

External links

 

Railway stations in Val-d'Oise
Railway stations in France opened in 1876